Andrew Mukuba (born December 7, 2002) is a Zimbabwean American football safety for the Clemson Tigers.

Early life and high school
Mukuba was born and initially grew up in Harare, Zimbabwe. His parents and older siblings were refugees from the Democratic Republic of the Congo. He immigrated to Austin, Texas with his family when he was nine years old after being granted asylum. Mukuba attended Lyndon B. Johnson High School. Mukuba was rated a four-star recruit and committed to play college football at Clemson over offers from LSU and Texas.

College career
Mukuba joined the Clemson Tigers in January, 2021, as an early enrollee. He was named a starter at safety and became the first defensive back to start in a season opener for Clemson since freshman became eligible to play in 1973. Mukuba was named the Atlantic Coast Conference (ACC) Defensive Rookie of the Year and third team All-ACC after finishing the season with 54 tackles, two tackles for loss, one sack, nine passes broken up and a fumble recovery.

References

External links
Clemson Tigers bio

2002 births
Living people
Clemson Tigers football players
Players of American football from Texas
American football safeties
Zimbabwean players of American football